Küçükyenice is the name of several villages in Turkey:

 Küçükyenice, Gölpazarı
 Küçükyenice, İnegöl
 Küçükyenice, İvrindi
 Küçükyenice, Mudanya